The next Odisha Legislative Assembly election is scheduled to be held in or before June 2024 to elect all 147 members of the state assembly.

Background 
The tenure of Odisha Legislative Assembly is scheduled to end on 24 June 2024. The previous assembly elections were held in April 2019. After the election, Biju Janata Dal formed the state government, with Naveen Patnaik becoming Chief Minister.

Schedule

Parties and alliances







Others

See also
Elections in India

References

State Assembly elections in Odisha
O